Baryspira is a genus of medium-sized sea snails, marine gastropod molluscs in the family Olividae, the olives.

Species
Species within the genus Baryspira include:
 Baryspira australis  Sowerby, G.B. I, 1830
 Baryspira longispira Kira, 1955
 Baryspira urasima  Yokoyama, 1922

References

Olividae